is both a superhero film and the fifth television series in the Garo metaseries that serve as sequels to Garo: Yami o Terasu Mono. Wataru Kuriyama and Miki Nanri reprise their roles and are joined by new cast members which include Masahiro Inoue as the antagonist Jinga. The film prequel was released in theatres on March 28, 2015, while the television series began broadcast on April 3, 2015.

Plot

Both the film and television series for Garo: Gold Storm Sho are direct sequels to Garo: Yami o Terasu Mono.

Film
Months after the events in Vol City, Ryuga Dogai has just slain the Horror Murado when he begins to suffer the effects of the accumulated evil energy within the armor. Rian luckily knows of a Makai Priestess in Line City that can purify the armor, searching the city while coming across a kebabe stand owned by D Ringo. Ryuga and Rian eventually find the abode of Line City's resident Makai Priestess Ryume. Ryume takes the Garo armor from Ryuga to purify it over the course of two days, the Makai Knight assured that there are no Horrors within Line City to worry about. As Ryuga and Rian eat at D Ringo's stand, they see a painting that the owner explained to be of a statue of a guardian that mysteriously disappeared. When D Ringo's charm starts acting up, Zaruba senses an evil presence with the kebabe owner revealing there are ruins near the city outskirts.

Ryuga and Rian come to the ruins to find a group of Makai Priests dead before being the figure responsible. The figure proceeds to overwhelm Ryuga and Rian before escaping them, with Ryuga finding an item that fell off him. The two return to Ryume, who reveals the object the figure stole is the forearm of the mad Horror Degol that she kept in check with her power. Parting ways with Rian to cover ground, Ryuga visits D Ringo who gives him an ancient Madou Tome detailing a Makai Priest named Sōtatsu who used his craftsmanship skills to create a humanoid Madōgu named Agō. Ryuga realizes that the figure is Agō as Rian finds him while in the middle of repairing himself. As Agō overpowers Rian, he explains his dream is a world without Horrors and came to the conclusion before taking his leave. After meeting up, Ryuga stopping Rian from hurting a petty thief who was working for Murado, the two discuss what they have learned about Agō before Zaruba senses a ki disruption across the city.

The two realize that Agō plans to use Ryume's means to keep Horrors from infesting Line City to wipe out everyone in the city with Degol's energies. But Agō had already defeated Ryume, with D-Ringo taking Ryuga and Rian to the central hub while providing them with Makai weapons he acquired from the black market. Fighting Ryuga as Rian frees Ryume, Agō reveals his goal to create a Horror-less world is by wiping out humanity itself. As their battle eventually comes to a highway, Ryuga explains that he and Rian share Agō's dream but refuses to acknowledge killing humans to achieve. It would be at that time that Degol awakens, revealing himself to be the Horror that killed Sōtatsu long ago as he consumes Agō's body to recreate his physical form. Luckily, Ryuga gains a purified and upgraded version of the Garo Armor so he can fight the Horror while reaching Agō. Finally understanding his creator's intention, Agō uses what strength he had left to restrain Dregor while giving Ryuga his weapon to destroy the Horror. Ryuga finds only a fragment of Agō, understanding the truth behind Agō's words but feels such a world without humans would be a tragedy. Later, after Ryume gives Zaruba an upgrade so they can seek her help, seeing D-Ringo on the way out, Ryuga and Rian leave.

Television series
After successfully saving Ryume and stopping Agō, Ryuga and Rian are assigned under her as guardians of Line City as they investigate a mysterious increase in Horror activity in the area. This is all a plot by fallen Makai Knight Jinga and his wife Makai Priestess Amily, who have since become Horrors years ago as a result of giving into his darkness following the death of their son, to raise the ancient weapon Radan to destroy humanity. To stop them, Ryuga and Rian team up with Daigo Akizuki, Giga the Beast Knight, and the Makai Priests Gald and Haruna, as well as D Ringo and Yukihime before the two Horrors can succeed in their plans.

Episodes

Cast
: 
: 
: 
: 
: 
, : 
:

Movie cast
: 
: 
Fuji: 
: 
: 
: 
Little girl: 
Old woman: 
Truck driver: 
, : 
Ryume (Voice): 
Fuji (Voice): 
Raiji (Voice): 
Little girl (Voice):

Series cast
: 
: 
: 
: 
: 
Raiji:

Theme songs

Movie
Opening theme

Composition & Arrangement: Shiho Terada, Yoshichika Kuriyama
Artist: Masami Okui, Hiroshi Kitadani, Yoshiki Fukuyama
Ending theme

Composition: Hironobu Kageyama, Shiho Terada, Yoshichika Kuriyama
Arrangement: Shiho Terada

Series
Opening themes
"GOLD STORM"
Composition & Arrangement: Shiho Terada, Yoshichika Kuriyama
Artist: JAM Project
Episodes: 1-12

Lyrics: Masami Okui
Composition: Hironobu Kageyama
Arrangement: Kenichi Sudō
Artist: JAM Project
Episodes: 13-22
Ending themes
"PRAYERS"
Lyrics: Masami Okui
Composition: Hironobu Kageyama
Arrangement: Shiho Terada
Artist: 
YUKIHIME: Momoko Kuroki
RYUME: Sakina Kuwae
REKKA: Mary Matsuyama
ANNA: Eri Ōzeki
Produced by team GAJARI (Hironobu Kageyama, Masami Okui, Keita Amemiya)
Episodes: 1-12

Lyrics: Masami Okui
Composition: Hironobu Kageyama
Arrangement: Hijiri Anze
Artist: Makai Kagekidan
Episodes: 13-23

References

External links
Official website for the movie 
Official website for the TV series 
Official website at TV Tokyo 

Garo (TV series)
Tokusatsu television series
Japanese horror fiction television series
Martial arts television series
TV Tokyo original programming